Hay is a farm near Quethiock in Cornwall, England.

See also

 List of farms in Cornwall

References

Farms in Cornwall